Voetbalvereniging Gemert is an association football club from Gemert, Netherlands. In the 2017-18 season it plays in the Sunday Hoofdklasse B.

History 
Gemert's recent appearances in the Dutch national cup were in 2006–07, 2009–10, 2010–11, and 2012–13. In 2012–13 it reached the second round, in 2010–11 it reached the third round.

In the 2021–22 season, Gemert qualified for the promotion playoffs, but lost 4–1 on aggregate to GVVV in the first round.

References

Sport in Gemert-Bakel
Football clubs in the Netherlands
Football clubs in North Brabant
1912 establishments in the Netherlands
Association football clubs established in 1912